The 2020 Genesys 300 was an IndyCar Series event that was held on June 6, 2020 at Texas Motor Speedway in Fort Worth, Texas. It was the opening event of the 2020 IndyCar Series, due to race cancellations and postponements tied to the COVID-19 pandemic.

Background 
On May 7, 2020, it was announced that the season would commence with a condensed, one-day event format at Texas Motor Speedway.  Although intended to be run without spectators, Sonic Automotive (which owns the circuit under their Speedway Motorsports subsidiary) followed protocol in use at their NASCAR weekend at Charlotte by allowing owners and tenants of the Turn 2 Lone Star Towers office and condominium complex to have tickets and parking passes to watch the event from their units.  Drivers and crew members were subject to social distancing and health screening protocols, and use of face coverings was mandated. Practice, qualifying and the race took place on the same day, requiring it to be shortened from 248 laps or around 600 kilometres (370 miles), to 200 laps (300 miles).

As the pandemic prevented Firestone from manufacturing new tire compounds for the race, existing compounds were used instead. The right-hand tires had originally been manufactured for tests at the track in 2019, simulating the effects of the new aeroscreen introduced to all vehicles for the 2020 season. The left-hand tires were originally manufactured for the 2019 Indianapolis 500. Due to these tire variances, Firestone and IndyCar required that these tires be replaced after 35 laps of use, with each car provided with nine sets of tires to use across the day.

Entry list
In May 2020, DragonSpeed revealed that it planned to prioritize an entry for the rescheduled Indianapolis 500, so that it could initially focus on its core European Le Mans Series operations. On June 2, Carlin withdrew its entry for the race in the #31, citing economic impacts of the pandemic in Europe.

All cars ran a Dallara safety tub utilizing the IndyCar mandated Universal Aero Kit 18. All cars also utilized Firestone tires.

Withdrawn

Full Results

Practice
Practice ran on race day from 12:30 p.m. to 2:30 p.m. CT

Qualifying
Qualifying was run on race day starting at 5 p.m. (ET)

Race

Notes:
 Points include 1 point for leading at least 1 lap during a race, an additional 2 points for leading the most race laps, and 1 point for Pole Position.

Race statistics
Average speed: 

Lead changes: 5

Championship standings after the race

Drivers' Championship standings

Engine Manufacturer standings

 Note: Only the top five positions are included.

Broadcasting

Television 
Originally scheduled for NBCSN, it was announced on May 24 that the race would move to NBC, marking the first IndyCar Series event to air in primetime on network television in seven years. With 1.285 million viewers, it was the most-watched IndyCar Series event outside of the Indianapolis 500 since 2016.

The race was called at the track with Leigh Diffey doing play-by-play. Paul Tracy and Townsend Bell as analysts, with Marty Snider and Kelli Stavast reporting on pit lane.

Radio 
The race was carried by the IndyCar Radio Network. Mark Jaynes served as the chief announcer from WIBC Radio studios along with Davey Hamilton  as Driver Expert. Jake Query called the field down the backstretch from WIBC studios. Nick Yeoman was the sole pit reporter at the track.

References

2018
2020 in IndyCar
2020 in sports in Texas
2020 DXC Technology 300
June 2020 sports events in the United States